Brewington may refer to:

 Brewington (surname), English surname
 5799 Brewington, main-belt asteroid 
 Brewington Creek, a river in Texas